Oodemas laysanensis, the Laysan weevil, was a species of beetle in family Curculionidae. It was endemic to the United States (Laysan, Hawaiian Islands) (declared extinct in 1986).

See also 
 List of extinct animals of the Hawaiian Islands

Sources 

Entiminae
Beetles described in 1914
Taxonomy articles created by Polbot